Germán Busch assumed office as the 36th President of Bolivia on 13 July 1937, and his term was cut short by his death on 23 August 1939. A young military officer during the Chaco War, Busch attempted to champion the cause of Military Socialism brought forth by his predecessor David Toro but, unhappy with the results produced by his few reforms, opted to declare himself dictator in April 1939 before committing suicide four months later.

Busch formed three cabinets during his 25-month presidency, constituting the 98th to 100th national cabinets of Bolivia as part of the 1936–1938 Government Junta.

Cabinet Ministers

Composition

First cabinet 
Having secured the resignation of President David Toro on 13 July 1937, Germán Busch entered the Palacio Quemado and established his first cabinet. The government was a mixture of leftist military officers and members of the United Socialist Party (PSU) which had collaborated with the Toro regime.

The Council of Ministers formed by Germán Busch indicated a continued struggle his regime faced in pinpointing a clear ideology. Politically, Busch appointed ministers generally in line with the moderate socialism of Toro, choosing the head of the PSU Enrique Baldivieso as foreign minister and the moderate socialist Gabriel Gosálvez as secretary-general. However, at the same time, he appointed such figures as the right-wing Federico Gutiérrez Granier in the crucial office of Minister of Finance, a position the Liberal politician would use to undo many of the consumer goods subsidies of the Toro regime. Minister of Agriculture Julio Salmón and Minister of Education Bernardo Navajas Trigo were also Liberals.

Second cabinet 
The cabinet was renewed on 23 November 1937. Three ministerial positions were changed: Federico Gutiérrez Granier with Eduardo Belmont Baldivia as Minister of Finance, Angel Ayoroa with Alfredo Peñaranda as Minister of Industry, with Peñaranda's former position as Minister of Education being filled by Héctor Ormachea Zalles. The following month on 14 December, Foreign Minister Enrique Baldivieso was exchanged with Eduardo Díez de Medina who had served in the position once before.

During this period starting on 23 May, the National Convention of 1938 would be held and charged with rewriting the constitution. On 27 May, the National Convention would proclaim Busch constitutional president with Enrique Baldivieso as vice president.

Third cabinet 
Busch's third cabinet was formed on 12 August 1938. Gabriel Gosálvez would be appointed Minister of Government and Justice as well as Propaganda which had previously been under the purview of the Foreign Ministry. No Secretary-General was appointed to replace him. Multiple health related ministries would be established as part of this cabinet. Upon the formation of the cabinet on 12 August, the new Minister of Labor Alberto Zelada would also be appointed to the position of Minister of Sanitation. Ten days later on 22 August, a dedicated Ministry of Health and Hygiene would be established with Alfredo Mollinedo appointed to head the position.

On 30 October, the National Convention would promulgate the new constitution. While the constitution would remain in effect until 1945, Busch would dismiss the national assembly on 24 April 1939 and declare himself dictator. Busch's presidency would come to an end four months later when he committed suicide. General Carlos Quintanilla would take hold of the presidency in the interim period and the majority of the Busch cabinet, save for Alfredo Mollinedo, Bernardo Navjas Trigo, Vicente Leyton, and Felipe Manuel Rivera, would be dismissed.

Established Ministries 

 Office of Sanitation (under Work and Social Security): Alberto Zelada, first holder from 12 August 1938
 Ministry of Health and Hygiene: Alfredo Mollinedo (PSU), first holder from 22 August 1938

Gallery

Notes

References

Bibliography 
 

Cabinets of Bolivia
Cabinets established in 1937
Cabinets disestablished in 1939
1937 establishments in Bolivia